Robert Cartwright (born August 1930) is an English art director. He was nominated for four Academy Awards (all shared) in the category Best Art Direction.

Partial filmography
Academy Award nominations in bold

 Becket (1964) (nominated with John Bryan, Maurice Carter and Patrick McLoughlin)
 A Countess from Hong Kong (1967)
 Scrooge (1970) (with Terence Marsh and Pamela Cornell)
 The Devils (1971)
 Mary, Queen of Scots (1971) (with Terence Marsh and Peter Howitt)
 Follow Me! (1972)
 The Optimists of Nine Elms (1973)
 Hanover Street (1979)
 The Elephant Man (1980) (with Stuart Craig and Hugh Scaife)
 Five Days One Summer (1982)
 Lifeforce (1985)

References

External links
 
 
 BFI page

Living people
1930 births
People from Wiltshire
English art directors